The Entombment of Christ is an oil painting by El Greco, painted between 1570 and 1576. It is preserved in the Alexandros Soutzos Museum.

Analysis
It belongs to the Roman period of El Greco. The scene takes place in a cave, where the figures are silhouetted against a dark background and craggy rocks. A character back introduces the public to the composition, a mannerist style. the strong influence of Michelangelo is seen in the face of Christ to the apostles.

El Greco manages to convey the feelings of sadness and desolation of the holy women. His ability as a portraitist is demonstrated by playing with sienna and blue hues.

Bibliography

External links
ArteHistoria.com. «anto Entierro [accessed 19.12.2010].

Paintings by El Greco
1570s paintings
Paintings in Greece
Paintings of the Descent from the Cross